Siberian Express is an album by American jazz group David Becker Tribune, released in 1988.

Background
Siberian Express reached No. 3 on the R&R charts.

Track listing
All writing by David Becker except where indicated

 "Anja"
 "Hilversum"
 "Siberian Express"
 "Central Park West" (John Coltrane)
 "Red Mogambo"
 "Dance of the Candy Cats"
 "Taps"
 "Waiting for Chet"
 "Land of Floren"
 "Reflections"

Personnel
 David Becker – acoustic and electric guitars, synthesizer
 Jim Donica – double bass, bass guitar
 Bruce Becker – drums, percussion

Guests
 Jimmy Johnson – bass
 Vinnie Colaiuta – drums
 Brian Kilgore – percussion

References

1988 albums